Motor sport in New Zealand can be traced back to a least 1901 when the Pioneer Cycle Club held a three-mile handicap race which included both motor bikes and cars. Since then it has developed and now almost all types of motor sport events are represented.

History

Initially motor sport in New Zealand was organised by cycle clubs with both motor bikes and cars taking part in the same events. The earliest recorded motorcar and motorbike race in New Zealand took place in Christchurch. On 8 November 1901 the Pioneer Cycle Club held a 3-mile automobile race at Hagley Park between a Brown motor quad driven by A Lowry, a Minerva engined Stella motor bicycle ridden by A Every, and a Star Motor Company Voiturette driven by Noel Oates. The motor bicycle won the race. Noel Oates was the proprietor of the Zealandia Cycling Works, a successful Christchurch based cycle manufacturer.

By 1903 motor cycles were competing in their own events. In 1905 motor sport events included hill climbs.

The first motor race meeting with multiple events was organized by the Canterbury Automobile Association on 26 December 1905 at the Metropolitan Trotting Grounds (now known as the Addington Raceway). The event included a gymkhana to test driver skills, several 5 mile long motor races for cars based horse power classes, and two motor bicycle races. Dr Thacker's Beeston-Humber driven by A Duncan won the main race for cars under 12 hp.

Reliability trials (now called Economy Runs) also started in this period. These were usually organised by the local Automobile Association. These were followed by motor car and bike races on various beaches.

Motorcycle grass track racing at horse race tracks continued during the war period. As did beach racing at locations such as New Brighton. While these events were predominantly male drivers, there were events specifically for female motor cyclists.

Motorbike racing

Early motor cycle races took place at various horse race tracks throughout the country. Later races also took place on beaches. An example of these was the 100 mile race at New Brighton organized by the Pioneer Motorcycle Club and held on 13 January 1917. The race was won by Ernest F C Hinds on a 7 hp Harley-Davidson.

The first New Zealand rider on the international scene was Alan Woodman. He raced in the 1910 Isle of Man TT race, crashed, and lost his leg as a result of the incident. Despite this disability Woodman continued to successfully race motor cycles.

Another early New Zealand motorcycle champion was Rod Coleman's father, Percy Coleman. Percy begun racing in 1912 on a 3.5 horsepower Humber at Ashhurst race course. In 1913 riding a Douglas, he won the New Zealand 5 mile light weight championship. By 1914, on an Indian, he was the top New Zealand rider. By 1914 he held the Australasian 1, 5, and 10 mile speed records. In 1915 he switched for a season to the Big X Excelsior, returning to an 8 valve Indian the following. In 1919 he went to the United States and competed in the Ascot 200 at Ascot Park, Los Angeles. He finished 8th on an Indian. He then returned to New Zealand to continue his Australasian racing career. Percy raced unsuccessfully in the 1930 Isle of Man TT race.

By 1917 motor cycle racing had been divided into different classes: light, medium, heavy-weight; open; and ladies. Light weight machines were up to 350 or 600cc if no medium weight class was run. Medium weight was from over 350cc to 600cc, and heavy weight over 600cc. Ladies were restricted to up to 350cc. Sidecar motorcycles were also raced at some events.

Track racing
 Castrol Six Hour (New Zealand)

Speedway
 Motorcycle speedway
 New Zealand Solo Championship

Motor cross

Hill Climb
 Silverstone Race to the Sky

Car racing

Track racing

Open wheelers

 Chris Amon Racing - Formula 1 team
 Formula Ford
 Formula Holden
 Formula Mondial
 Formula Pacific - New Zealand staged the first ever races for Formula Pacific cars in January 1977  having abandoned Formula 5000 and moved to the new formula in that year. The category continued there until Formula Mondial was introduced in 1983.
 New Zealand Grand Prix
 Tasman Series
 Toyota Racing Series

Single make
 Suzuki Swift Sport Cup
 Toyota Finance 86 Championship
 Mazda Racing Series

Production and touring cars
 
 Auckland 500
 Hamilton 400 - from 2008 to 2012
 John McIntyre Racing - racing team
 M3 Racing - racing team
 New Zealand Touring Car Championship 1984-2002
 NZ Touring Cars championship V8 touring cars from 2003 to 2011
 Super Black Racing - racing team
 Suzuki Swift Sport Cup
 Tasman Motorsport - racing team
 V8SuperTourer - from 2012 to 2015

Endurance
National Endurance Championship: A one off 1 day meeting where the top 20 cars from the South Island Endurance & North Island Endurance Series compete for the National Endurance titles in 1 hour and 3 hour races.

 24 Hours of Lemons - Heralded as New Zealand's largest participation motorsport series, 24 Hours of Lemons ran the first ever continuous endurance race in NZ history in May 2018 at Hampton Downs Motorsport Park.
 Pukekohe 500 - an endurance production and touring car race held since 1963
 Wellington 500 - an endurance touring car race held from 1985 to 1996

Drifting

 D1NZ

Drag racing
Drag racing in New Zealand started in the 1960s. The New Zealand Hot Rod Association (NZHRA) sanctioned what is believed to have been the first drag meeting at an open cut coal mine at Kopuku, south of Auckland, sometime in 1966. In 1973, the first and only purpose built drag strip opened in Meremere by the Pukekohe Hot Rod Club. In April 1993 the governance of drag racing was separated from the NZHRA and the New Zealand Drag Racing Association (NZDRA) was formed. In 2014, New Zealand's second purpose built drag strip - Masterton Motorplex - opened.

The first New Zealand Drag Racing Nationals was held in the 1966/67 season at Kopuku, near Auckland.

There are now two governing bodies operating drag racing in New Zealand with the IHRA sanctioning both of New Zealands major tracks at Ruapuna (Pegasus Bay Drag Racing Association) in the South Island and Meremere Dragway Inc in the North Island. NZDRA being the other organisation now run at Masterton Motorplex and Taupo as well as using  the Street car old airstrips and closed roads throughout the country. NZDRA NZ is the sanctioned governing body of dragracing in New Zealand.

Hill Climb

 Silverstone Race to the Sky

Rallying
 International Rally of Whangarei
 New Zealand Rally Championship
 Targa New Zealand

Stockcar (dirt track racing)

Stockcar racing began in New Zealand during the 1950s, first race was at Aranui Speedway on November 27, 1954. It was brought to New Zealand after New Zealand Speedway riders witnessed the huge crowds that watched the races in Britain earlier that year. As with the UK, Stockcar racing in New Zealand is a very different form of racing than that of the US.  Stockcar racing is a full-contact sport in New Zealand: as the rule book states, "contact is not only permitted, it is encouraged".
Cars are built to an extremely rigid design and feature strong steel guards around almost the entire car. "Stockcars" are divided into three classes: Superstocks, Stockcars, Ministocks (Ministocks predominantly being a non-contact youth class).
Superstocks are the top class and are typically powered by V8 engines up to 248 cubic inch which can produce over 500 bhp.  The majority of races are of an individual nature however, unique to New Zealand stockcar racing is the team racing format.  Typically teams racing consists of two teams of four cars each that work together to win the race. Teams normally protect their "runners" while attempting to eliminate the opposing team, the races can be decided by a points format or first across the finish line.

The class most resembling the North American form of stockcar racing are known as Saloon cars. Super Saloons are similar to dirt late models, with the main differences being the bodies closer resemble production cars, use iron engines up to 434 cubic inch with no rear offset and run much larger sprintcar tyres on the rear.

Speedway

 Midget car racing
 Speedway Grand Prix of New Zealand

Economy runs

Motorkhana

Off-road racing
Off-road racing runs its own class structure and has a multiple-round national championship. Its flagship event, the two-day, 1000 km Taupo 1000, is a stand-alone international endurance race which is currently held every other year. The event started life in 1992, as the "made for television" Bridgestone 1000 and was the first Offroad Endurance Race in New Zealand to include teams from Australia, New Zealand and the US. That event was won outright by Les Siviour of Australia driving a Class 6 Nissan Patrol, for Team Nissan. The most successful and popular racer in the sport's history in New Zealand is multiple outright and class national champion Ian Foster of Henderson, Auckland. At the height of his career he had amassed 21 back to back wins, driving for Team Tamiya in an Unlimited Class 1 race car built by Cougar Race Cars. Ian was one of the co-founders of the sports national organising body, known as ORANZ. The sport is about to enter its 30th year.

Historic vehicles
 Southern Festival of Speed

Speed boats
Motor boat racing took place as early as 1917. Racing was held in various classes and included handicap races.

Truck racing

Four wheel drive

Venues

 Ardmore Airport (New Zealand), Auckland
 Beachlands Speedway, Waldronville, Dunedin
 Bruce McLaren Motorsport Park, Taupo
 Cemetery Circuit, Whanganui
 Dunedin Street Circuit
 Hamilton Street Circuit
 Hampton Downs Motorsport Park, Northern Waikato
 Highlands Motorsport Park, Cromwell
 Manfeild Autocourse, Fielding
 Mike Pero Motorsport Park, Templeton
 Muriwai, beach motor racing from the 1920s to 1940s
 RNZAF Base Ohakea
 Paeroa Street Circuit
 Pukekohe Park Raceway
 Teretonga Park, Invercargill
 Timaru International Motor Raceway
 Waimate Street Circuit
 Wellington Street Circuit
 Western Springs Speedway
 Wigram Airfield Circuit

Notable people

 Paul Adams, rally driver
 Chris Amon, Formula 1 driver
 Hugh Anderson (motorcyclist), GP rider
 Bill Andrew, speedway rider
 Bruce Anstey, TT rider
 Andrew Bagnall, touring car driver
 Craig Baird, touring car and GT3 driver
 Earl Bamber, Porsche GTE driver
 Avalon Biddle, MotoGP rider
 Tom Black (speedway rider)
 Andy Booth (racing driver), open wheel and touring car driver
 Peter (Possum) Bourne, rally driver
 Barry Briggs, speedway rider
 Wayne Briggs, speedway rider
 Nick Cassidy, Toyota racing series and Formula E driver
 Victor Chapman (racing driver), drift driver
 Percy Coleman, motorcyclist.
 Rod Coleman (motorcycle racer). The first New Zealander to win the Isle of Man TT race in 1954 and the son of Percy Coleman.
 Josh Coppins, motocross rider
 Fabian Coulthard, touring car driver
 Simon Crafar, GP and enduro rider
 Bruce Cribb, speedway rider
 Neville Crichton, touring car driver
 Graeme Crosby, GP rider
 Mitch Cunningham, kart and GT3 racer
 Wade Cunningham, Indy Lights driver
 Grant Dalton, motorcyclist
 James Dawber, motorcyclist and holder of the world grass track speed record in 1917 on a 3.5 hp Indian
 Scott Dixon, Indy car driver
 Paul Dobbs, TT rider
 Mitch Evans, Formula E driver
 Simon Evans (racing driver), touring car driver
 John Faulkner (racing driver), touring and production car driver
 Angus Fogg, touring car driver
 Robbie Francevic. touring car driver
 Rodger Freeth, motorcyclist and sports car driver
 Howden Ganley, Formula 1 driver
 Antonio Marcel Green, drift and rally driver
 Daniel Gaunt, touring car driver
 Matt Halliday, touring and GT car driver
 Brendon Hartley, FIA Endurance series driver
 John Hempleman, GP rider
 Bert Hawthorne, open wheel racer
 Andre Heimgartner, touring car driver
 Ernest F C Hinds, motorcyclist, horse owner, and cycle importer
 Dave Hiscock, speedway rider
 Neville Hiscock, GP rider
 Robert Holden (motorcyclist), GP and TT rider
 Mick Holland, speedway rider and founder New Zealand stock cars racing
 Denny Hulme, Formula 1 driver
 Dennis Ireland, GP rider
 Peter Janson, touring car driver
 Syd Jensen, motor cycle and sports car racer
 Ron Johnston, speedway rider
 Bob Kennett, Trans-Am driver and son of Brady Kennett
 Brady Kennett, touring and production car, and truck racer
 Wally Kilmister, grass track and speedway rider
 Darryl King, motocross rider
 Shayne King, motocross rider
 Chris Lange, rally driver 
 Graeme Lawrence, open wheel car driver
 Damon Leitch, Toyota Racing series driver
 Jono Lester, GT racing car driver
 Sybil Audrey Marie Lupp, sports car driver
 Geoff Mardon, speedway rider
 Ivan Mauger, motorcycle speedway rider
 Joe McAndrew, rally driver
 Bruce McLaren, Formula 1 and sports car driver
 Scott McLaughlin (racing driver), touring car driver
 Graham McRae, Formula 1 driver
 Rhys Millen, rally driver
 Rod Millen, rally driver
 Steve Millen, rally driver
 Ginger Molloy, GP rider
 Ronnie Moore (speedway rider)
 Ken Mudford, GP rider
 Burt Munro, speedway rider
 Greg Murphy, touring car driver
 Kim Newcombe, motor cycle racer
 John Nicholson (racing driver), Formula 1 driver
 Hayden Paddon, rally driver
 Michael Pickens, speedway driver
 Paul Radisich, touring car driver
 Trevor Redmond, speedway rider
 Jason Richards, touring car driver 
 Jim Richards (racing driver), touring car driver
 Steven Richards, touring car driver and son of Jim Richards
 Blair Robson, rally driver
 Larry Ross, speedway rider
 Dave Ryan (motorsport), team manager
 Kayne Scott, touring car driver
 Tony Shelly, Formula 1 driver
 Levi Sherwood, freestyle motocross rider
 Mitch Shirra, speedway rider
 Frank Shuter, speedway rider
 Aaron Slight, motor cycle and touring car racer
 Ken Smith (racing driver), open wheel racing driver
 Richie Stanaway, speedway and endurance car racer
 Dominic Storey, touring car driver
 Andrew Stroud, GP rider
 Mike Thackwell, open wheel racing driver
 Rick Timmo, speedway rider
 Ben Townley, motocross rider
 Ted Tracey, speedway driver
 Keith Turner (motorcyclist), GP rider
 Chris van der Drift, open wheel and GT driver
 Shane van Gisbergen, touring car and GT car driver
 Bob Wallace (test driver), mechanic, test driver, and developer
 "Mad" Mike Whiddett, drift racer
 Steve Williams, speedway driver and former caddy for Tiger Woods
 Simon Wills, touring car driver
 Rob Wilson (racing driver), endurance racing
 Alan Woodman, Isle of Mann TT rider from Blenheim who lost his leg during the 1910 race

Manufacturers

 Almac (automobile) - sports cars
 Chevron Engineering Ltd - sports cars
 Heron Cars - sports cars
 McRae Cars - racing cars
 Malcolm Webb made the Mallock U2 Mark 8B, under licence from  Arthur Mallock of England, in Wellington NZ in 1969.
 Rodin Cars - racing cars created by David Dicker
 Sabre Motorsport - Formula First manufacturer

Clubs and organisations

 Manawatu Motor Cycle Club - club formed in the early 20th century
 Marton Motor Cycle Club - extant in 1917
 Manukau Motor Boat Club - extant in 1917
 Motorcycling New Zealand Inc - successor to NZACU
 MotorSport New Zealand - governing body for motor sport
 Napier Motor Cycle Club - extant in 1917
 New Zealand Auto-Cycle Union (NZACU) - 1916 to 1994 - succeeded by Motor Cycling New Zealand
 New Zealand Drag Racing Association
 New Zealand Hot Rod Association
 New Zealand Power Boat Association - extant in 1917
 North Canterbury Motor Cycle Club - in existence prior to World War 1, but ceased by 1917
 North Island Riders Association - a riders union for professional North Island motor cycle riders extant in 1917
 Otago Motor Club - a motorsport club in existence from before 1914 based in Dunedin
 Otago Sports Car Club (OSCC) is a motorsport club based in Dunedin, New Zealand. Founded in 1947 the club is the main organisation for club-level motorsport in Dunedin. The OSCC is affiliated to, and a founder member of, Motorsport New Zealand the FIA sanctioned motor-sports authority of New Zealand. The OSCC organises the International Rally of Otago, a hillclimb championship, an autocross championship, assists with the Southern Festival of Speed, and publishes a quarterly magazine, Wheelspin.
 Otago Yacht and Motor Boat Club - early 20th century
 Pioneer Motorcycle Club (formerly the Pioneer Cycle Club) - the Canterbury-based club was founded in 1878 and renamed in the early 20th century.
 Wellington Motor Cycle Club - extant 1917

Publications
 New Zealand Hot Rod began publishing in 1967
 The motor in New Zealand - an annual magazine supplement of Progress a publication from the early 1900s by Harry H Tomb's Ltd
 Wheeling - a pre WW1 cycling and motor cycling magazine that continued in publication during World War 1
 Wheelspin - Otago Car Club magazine

Teams
 International Motorsport - Auckland based touring car racing team
 Mark Petch Motorsport - touring car and transam racing team disbanded in 2009

Illegal motor sport

New Zealand also has strict rules on vehicle modifications and a registered engineer must audit any major modification and certify road-worthiness within a system known as the Low Volume Vehicle Technical Association. The LVVTA exists to service legal motorsport and responsible modifications only. Unofficial street racing remains illegal and police are well endowed with equipment to use, such as 'sustained loss of traction' which carries a minimum sentence of licence disqualification and maximum sentence of imprisonment. Street racing is common in New Zealand and there are many small clubs offering street racing in remote rural roads. Despite its popularity, rates of incident due to street racing in New Zealand are relatively low.

References

External links
 New Zealand Titles, www.motorsport.org.nz